Sings Kristofferson is the 23rd studio album recorded by Willie Nelson in 1979 consisting of all covers of Kris Kristofferson songs. It reached #5 on the US Country albums chart, #42 on the US Pop albums charts, and was certified gold in Canada and platinum in the US. The cover is very simple, a single picture of Nelson's face against a black background, with the song titles to the right of his face. The back cover is the same background with both Nelson and Kristofferson's faces together.

Track listing
All tracks composed by Kris Kristofferson; except where indicated

Side one
 "Me and Bobby McGee" (Fred Foster, Kristofferson) (5:40)
 "Help Me Make It Through the Night" (3:57)
 "The Pilgrim, Chapter 33" (3:33)
 "Why Me" (3:52)
 "For the Good Times" (5:24)

Side two
 "You Show Me Yours (And I'll Show You Mine)" (3:54)
 "Lovin' Her Was Easier (Than Anything I'll Ever Do Again)" (5:50)
 "Sunday Mornin' Comin' Down" (7:02)
 "Please Don't Tell Me How the Story Ends" (2:48)

Personnel
 Willie Nelson – lead vocals, guitar
 Jody Payne – guitar
 Bobbie Nelson – piano
 Rex Ludwick – drums
 Paul English – drums
 Bee Spears – bass guitar
 Chris Ethridge – bass guitar
 Mickey Raphael – harmonica 
 Jerry Reed – electric guitar on "You Show Me Yours"
 Grady Martin – electric guitar on You Show Me Yours," "Sunday Mornin' Comin' Down"
 Albert Lee – electric guitar on "The Pilgrim"
 Booker T. Jones – organ on "Why Me"
 Kris Kristofferson – backing vocals
Technical
Bradley Hartman, Harold Lee - engineer
Norman Seeff - photography

Charts

Weekly charts

Year-end charts

References

1979 albums
Willie Nelson albums
Columbia Records albums
Kris Kristofferson tribute albums